William McCormick (1801 – 12 June 1878) was an Irish Conservative politician.

McCormick was elected as Member of Parliament (MP) for Londonderry City at a by-election in 1860 but stood down at the next general election in 1865.

References

External links
 

1801 births
1878 deaths
Irish Conservative Party MPs
Members of the Parliament of the United Kingdom for County Londonderry constituencies (1801–1922)
UK MPs 1859–1865